Leo Marchiori (26 June 1898 – 27 May 1949) was a Canadian cyclist. He competed in the sprint event at the 1932 Summer Olympics.

References

External links
 

1898 births
1949 deaths
Canadian male cyclists
Olympic cyclists of Canada
Cyclists at the 1932 Summer Olympics
Sportspeople from Venice
Italian male cyclists
Cyclists from the Metropolitan City of Venice